Sacred Heart Catholic School is a Catholic school based in Muenster, Texas, United States located on Sacred Heart Church grounds serving students in preschool through Grade 12.  Recognized in the top 50 of Catholic schools in the nation, SHCS is one of only two Catholic preschool and elementary schools in Cooke County and one of only four Catholic high schools in the Fort Worth Diocese.

Sacred Heart Montessori (Montessori program for three- and four-year-olds and kindergarten)
National Catholic Education Association Elizabeth Ann Seton Award
Sacred Heart Elementary (Grades 1-8)
U.S. Department of Education Blue Ribbon School of Excellence Award
Sacred Heart High School (Grades 9-12)
U.S. Department of Education Blue Ribbon School of Excellence Award
Catholic High School Honor Roll Award

Background
Sacred Heart Catholic School was established in 1890.  It began offering a 4 year high school program in 1937. 
Sacred Heart Catholic School is a member of the Texas Association of Private and Parochial Schools, (TAPPS).

Athletics
The Sacred Heart Tigers currently compete in the following sports:

Cross Country, Volleyball, Football, Basketball, Golf, Track, Softball & Baseball

The Tigers have also competed in Swimming and Tennis

Sacred Heart has won numerous State Championships in Girls Basketball, Football, Softball, Girls & Boys Track, Girls & Boys Cross Country, Boys Golf, and Boys and Girls Swim.

Football State Champions :
1994
2003
State Runner-Up:
2004 2021
Final Four:
2000
2001
2006
2019
2022
Girls Basketball State Champions
1982-1983
1985-1986
1987-1988
1988-1989
1989-1990
1997-1998
1998-1999
1999-2000
2000-2001
2001-2002
2002-2003
2003-2004
2006-2007
2011-2012
State Runner Up
1992-1993
1996-1997
2005-2006
2015-2016
2016-2017
State Final Four
1986-1987
1992-1993

Notes and references

External links
 Sacred Heart Church and School
 Muenster, Texas at TexasEscapes.com, with picture of the school

Catholic secondary schools in Texas
High schools in Cooke County, Texas
Educational institutions established in 1890
Private K-12 schools in Texas
1890 establishments in Texas